Kysyl-Yuryuyya (Kıhıl Ürüye) is a rural locality (a selo) in Kachikatsky Rural Okrug of Khangalassky District in the Sakha Republic, Russia, located  from Pokrovsk, the administrative center of the district, and  from Kachikattsy, the administrative center of the rural okrug. Its population as of the 2010 Census was 270; down from 273 recorded in the 2002 Census.

References

Notes

Sources
Official website of the Sakha Republic. Registry of the Administrative-Territorial Divisions of the Sakha Republic. Khangalassky District. 

Rural localities in Khangalassky District